Orbe Temple, also known as the Reformed Church of Notre-Dame or the Great Church of Orbe, is a Protestant church in the municipality of Orbe, canton of Vaud, Switzerland. It is a parish church of the Evangelical Reformed Church of the Canton of Vaud. It is listed as a heritage site of national significance.

History
The Great Church of Orbe was founded in the 12th century and destroyed for the first time in 1407 by a fire that devastated the whole building except the four walls and a few pillars. The church was re-built beginning in 1408 and completed a century later by Balthazar Huguenin and Balthazar Jeanneret with the walls included in the city walls. The works were ended by architect Antoine Lagniaz, who re-built the nave and the side aisles between 1521 and 1525. Moreover, three side chapels were enlarged in 1687.

The Post-Gothic church has five naves and notably features statues on the keystone, as well as capitals that represent Jesus Christ and the Virgin Mary surrounded by angels.

After the city was conquered by the canton of Berne in 1536 and after the introduction of the Reformation, the church became a temple and was shared by both faiths. The Protestant progressively made exclusive use of the building and installed a statue of reformer Pierre Viret (a native of Orbe) in the building in 1911.

The temple was listed among the Swiss Cultural Property of National Significance.

See also
List of cultural property of national significance in Switzerland: Vaud

References

Bibliography
 
 

Reformed church buildings in Switzerland
Churches in Vaud
Churches completed in 1687
12th-century establishments in Switzerland
Cultural property of national significance in the canton of Vaud